Sankyoku (Japanese: 三曲 / さんきょく) is a form of Japanese chamber music played often with a vocal accompaniment. It is traditionally played on shamisen, koto, and kokyū, but more recently the kokyū has been replaced by shakuhachi.

See also
Music of Japan
Koto (musical instrument)
Shakuhachi
Shamisen
Kokyū

References

Japanese traditional music